Carl Wright may refer to:
 Carl Wright (actor) (1932–2007), American tap dancer and actor
 Carl Wright (bishop) (born 1959), Bishop Suffragan of the Episcopal Diocese of the Armed Services and Federal Ministries
 Carl Wright (civil servant) (born 1950), British former director of the CTUG and Secretary-General of CLGF
 Carl Wright (cricketer) (born 1977), Jamaican-born American cricketer
 Carl P. Wright (1893–1961), Norwegian politician for the Conservative Party